Warren Sloan Warren is the James B. Duke Professor of Chemistry and Director of the Center for Molecular and Biomolecular Imaging at Duke University. He is also a Professor of Physics, Radiology, and Biomedical Engineering at the same institution. Warren is a deputy editor of the open-access journal Science Advances. He has contributed to the theory of Quantum Coherence as well as nonlinear optical spectroscopy.

Scholarship
Warren began his career in the field of Magnetic Resonance where his work contributed to the revised understanding of the interactions between widely separated spins.  Warren would go on to exploit these  "Intermolecular Multiple Quantum Coherences", and this work helped lead to the development of new pulse sequences for magnetic resonance imaging with new types of contrast. His work in nonlinear optics developed a range of optical methods which exploit laser pulse shaping to image molecular content, including tissue and paintings.

Students and Collaborators 

 Donna Strickland (University of Toronto) [postdoc]
 Debabrata Goswami (Indian Institute of Technology)
 Yung-ya Lin (UCLA)
 Thomas Theis (NCSU)
 Howe-Siang Tan (NTU)
 Louis Serge Bouchard (UCLA)

Books
Warren, Warren S. The Physical Basis of Chemistry Vol. 1 Academic Press, 1993  
Warren, Warren S. The Physical Basis of Chemistry Vol. 2 Academic Press, 2000

References

External links
Full list of publications

Living people
1955 births
21st-century American chemists
Duke University faculty
Harvard University alumni
University of California, Berkeley alumni
Princeton University faculty